Oshino Tameike is an earthfill dam located in Yamanashi Prefecture in Japan. The dam is used for irrigation. The catchment area of the dam is 1.7 km2. The dam impounds about 2  ha of land when full and can store 141 thousand cubic meters of water. The construction of the dam was completed in 1933.

References

Dams in Yamanashi Prefecture
1993 establishments in Japan